Bistort is a common name for several plants and may refer to:

Bistorta, a genus recognized by some sources including the species:
Bistorta bistortoides, native to North America
Bistorta officinalis (Persicaria bistorta), native to Europe